Diliskelesi is a port in Turkey.

References

Geography of Turkey